"Jesamine" is a song written by Marty Wilde (Frere Manston) and Ronnie Scott (Jack Gellar), and recorded by the English band the Casuals. Initially recorded by the Bystanders as "When Jezamine Goes", the version released by The Casuals became a hit song when it was released as a single in August 1968. It reached No. 2 on the UK Singles Chart in October 1968.

Background
The song was written by Marty Wilde and Ronnie Scott under the pseudonyms of Frere Manston and Jack Gellar. It was originally recorded by the Bystanders, a band managed by Scott, and released under the title "When Jezamine Goes" on Pye Records. The song, however, failed to make any impact on the chart. 

A version of the song was then recorded by the Casuals based largely on the Bystanders' arrangement. This version was successful in many countries; in the UK it reached No. 2, but kept off the No. 1 spot by Mary Hopkin's "Those Were The Days".

Reception
Paul Weller has described "Jesamine" as one of his favourite records. It was one of the songs in his record collection that he discussed on the 8 February 1998 BBC Radio One edition of All Back to Mine, describing it as "a beautiful record", that he loved the melody, and found it "sad", "nostalgic" but "really inspiring". He included it in the 2003 compilation of songs that influenced him, Under the Influence.

Robin Carmody of Freaky Trigger praised the song's "charming, sun-kissed flight" and grouped it among other early British bubblegum pop songs, like the Love Affair's "Everlasting Love" (1967) and the Tremeloes' "Suddenly You Love Me" (1968) for their emerging sense of optimism, "not in a cloying or false way, but appealingly (and unreachably) pre-ironic."

Charts

References

External links
 Performance on Beat-Club

1968 songs
1968 singles
Songs written by Marty Wilde
Songs written by Ronnie Scott (songwriter)
Bubblegum pop songs